The World's Funniest! is an American reality show that aired on Fox in 1997. It was hosted by James Brown and announced by Mark Thompson. The show was similar in format to ABC's America's Funniest Home Videos, but also featuring funny clips from TV shows, bloopers, and funny TV commercials. Unlike AFHV, there was no contest element and viewer-submitted videos were not rewarded with prizes. It was also hosted without a studio audience, with laughter backing during clips coming via laugh track.

Generally scheduled Sunday nights at 7PM ET (or after NFL football on the East Coast during football season, providing a program which could easily be joined in progress without much consequence to viewers), the series was seen on Fox until 2000.

The World's Funniest! was based on a series of specials on Fox, entitled, Oops! The World's Funniest Outtakes. It is not related outside of sharing a title and concept with the later Fox series World's Funniest (previously known as World's Funniest Fails), which was produced by Dick Clark Productions.

Broadcast history

References

External links
 TV.com listing
 IMDB listing

1990s American reality television series
2000s American reality television series
1990s American video clip television series
2000s American video clip television series
1997 American television series debuts
2000 American television series endings
English-language television shows
Fox Broadcasting Company original programming